Dubai Towers Istanbul (or DTI) was a skyscraper project that was to be built in the district of Levent, in Istanbul, Turkey.

It comprised a twin-tower complex which was to contain extensive office space, residential apartments and penthouses, retail outlets and boutique hotels. Had it been completed, the towers would have become the two tallest buildings in Turkey. Tower 1 was expected to reach a height of more than 300m (94 floors) and Tower 2 over 240m (74 floors).

The site for the project was the former IETT Bus Garage, on Büyükdere Avenue in the financial district of Levent. This prime plot of land is located amongst many of Istanbul's current crop of skyscrapers - across the road from the Sapphire of Istanbul (Turkey's current tallest building),and will reach 261m in height.

The project was proposed by developers Sama Dubai (formerly Dubai International Properties) who saw Istanbul as potential for foreign investment. The project will cost US$500,000,000 and is part of a US$5billion investment into the city.
The agreement states that Sama Dubai will hold 80% of DTI's shares, while the Istanbul Metropolitan Municipality, which currently owns the land plot, will hold 20%.

The project was cancelled in 2012.

Usage breakdown
The top 10 floors were to contain 36 penthouse apartments.
150 luxury residential flats with 24-hour service on the 20 floors below the penthouse apartments.
The 40 floors below the apartments with 24-hour service were allocated for apartments without service. There would be 330 residential flats in this section, making a total of 516 residential flats in Tower 1.
The 30 floors below the residential section were to be used as a 200-room boutique hotel with conference halls, exhibition centers and art galleries.
Tower 1 and Tower 2 would both have risen above a retail facility which would have focused exclusively on the world's top brands of fashion design.

Related news items
"Babacan holds contacts in Dubai for twin towers project" - Milliyet (english)

References

External links
Sama Dubai - official developer's site
Emporis Buildings Database: Dubai Towers Istanbul

Proposed skyscrapers
Buildings and structures in Istanbul
Twin towers